L'arbitro is a 2013 comedy film written and directed by .

The film was chosen as a pre-opener to the 10th edition of the Critic's Week Venice Days, at the 70th Venice International Film Festival.

Cast 
Stefano Accorsi as Cruciani
Geppi Cucciari as Miranda
 as Matzutzi
Marco Messeri as White
 as  Prospero
Francesco Pannofino as Arbitro Mureno
 as  Brai
 Grégoire Oestermann as  Jean Michel
 Andres Gioeni as guardalinee Cruciani
 Gustavo De Filpo as  guardalinee Cruciani

References

External links

2013 films
Italian sports comedy films
Italian association football films
2010s sports comedy films
Films set in Sardinia
2013 comedy films
2010s Italian-language films
2010s Italian films